Reinhold Saulmann (17 May 1895 – 6 June 1936) was an Estonian track and field sprinter.

Saulmann was a five-time Estonian champion in track and field events including the sprints and the 400 metres hurdles. He also held the Estonian records in the 150 m, 300 m, 400 m and 400 m hurdles.

At the 1920 Summer Olympics he was entered in the 100 m, 200 m and 400 m events. He did not start the 100 m and competed in only the first rounds of the longer sprints, although his estimated time of 51.6 in the 400 m heat was a national record. He also represented Estonia in bandy nine times in 1916–1918. Following his retirement from active competition he entered sports administration, serving as a club treasurer and a representative to the Estonian Olympic Committee. He died aged 41 in his native Tallinn in 1936.

References

1895 births
1936 deaths
Athletes from Tallinn
People from the Governorate of Estonia
Estonian male sprinters
Estonian bandy players
Olympic athletes of Estonia
Athletes (track and field) at the 1920 Summer Olympics